The Mark 21 torpedo, designated Mark 21 Mod 0 was a passive acoustic homing torpedo designed in 1943 by Westinghouse Electric Corporation. The Mark 21 successfully passed launching tests in 1943, however, due to difficulties encountered by Westinghouse, the project was abandoned after a few development models had been built. 

It was based on the widely used Mark 13 torpedo. Propulsion was switched to electric, but weight restrictions limited the speed available.

See also 
 Mark 21 Mod 2 torpedo, a similar but more successful project, with homing developed by Bell Labs, and using a steam turbine.

References

Torpedoes
Torpedoes of the United States
Unmanned underwater vehicles